Samuel J Nogajski (born 1 January 1979) is an Australian cricket umpire. He stood as an umpire in the 2016–17 Ranji Trophy in India.

Umpiring career 
He stood in his first Twenty20 International (T20I) on 19 February 2017, in the match between Australia and Sri Lanka at Kardinia Park, Geelong. He stood in his first One Day International (ODI) on 6 October 2017, in the match between Papua New Guinea and Scotland in the 2015–17 ICC World Cricket League Championship.

In October 2018, he was named as one of the twelve on-field umpires for the 2018 ICC Women's World Twenty20. In October 2019, he was appointed as one of the twelve umpires to officiate matches in the 2019 ICC T20 World Cup Qualifier tournament in the United Arab Emirates. In January 2020, he was named as one of the sixteen umpires for the 2020 Under-19 Cricket World Cup tournament in South Africa.

See also
 List of One Day International cricket umpires
 List of Twenty20 International cricket umpires

References

External links
 
 

1979 births
Australian cricket umpires
Australian One Day International cricket umpires
Australian Twenty20 International cricket umpires
Living people
Sportspeople from Hobart